El Mehdi Malki (born 1 January 1988 in Salé, Morocco) is a Moroccan judoka. He competed at the 2012 Summer Olympics in the +100 kg event.

References 

1988 births
Living people
Moroccan male judoka
Olympic judoka of Morocco
Judoka at the 2012 Summer Olympics
People from Salé
Competitors at the 2013 Mediterranean Games
Mediterranean Games competitors for Morocco
21st-century Moroccan people